Aldo Bartolomé Monteforte (January 4, 1929 – July 18, 2016), better known as Aldo Monti, was a Mexican actor. He went to Venezuela in 1947. Although he was also a director, he was better known for his acting.

Filmography 
Noche de milagros 
Al sur de Margarita 
La torre de marfil 
El diario de mi madre ‒ Carlos Montes
Misterios de la magia negra ‒ Raúl
Cadenas de amor
Teresa ‒ Mario (1959)
Las momias de Guanajuato (1962)
Janina ‒ Rodolfo (1962)
Valeria (1966 TV series)
La razón de vivir (1966)
El ídolo (1966)

El misterio de los hongos alucinantes (1968)
Pasión gitana (1968)
Flor marchita ‒ Renato Conti (1969)
El libro de piedra ‒ Carlos (1969)
El amor de María Isabel ‒ Ariel (1970)
Rubí ‒  Alejandro (1970)
La venganza de las mujeres vampiro (1970)
El amor tiene cara de mujer (1971)
Santo y Blue Demon vs Drácula y el Hombre Lobo ‒ Count Dracula (1973)
Barata de primavera ‒ Fernando Meraz (1975)
Teresa Raquin ‒ Lorenzo
Marcha nupcial ‒ Julio (1977)
Una mujer (1978)
Verónica ‒ Federico (1979)
El hogar que yo robé ‒ Luis Felipe (1981)
Confidente de secundaria (1996)
Entre el amor y el odio ‒ Lorenzo Ponti (2002)
Fray Justicia ‒ Federico (2009)

Works directed by Monti 

Santo en Anónimo mortal 
Acapulco 12-22 
Querer volar
Secuestro sangriento 
Vacaciones sangrientas 
Seducción sangrienta 
Horas violentas 
Obsesión asesina 
Uroboros

References

External links

1929 births
2016 deaths
Mexican male telenovela actors
Male actors from Rome
Italian emigrants to Mexico
Italian emigrants to Venezuela